Hermiston is a city in Umatilla County, Oregon, United States.  Its population of 19,973 makes it the largest city in Eastern Oregon. Hermiston is the largest, and fastest-growing, city in the Hermiston-Pendleton Micropolitan Statistical Area, the eighth largest  Core Based Statistical Area in Oregon with a combined population of 92,261 at the 2020 census.  Hermiston sits near the junction of I-82 and I-84, and is 7 miles south of the Columbia River, Lake Wallula, and the McNary Dam. The Hermiston area has become a hub for logistics and data center activity due to the proximity of the I-82 and I-84 interchange, Pacific Northwest fiber optic backbone, and low power costs.  The city is also known for its watermelons, which are part of its branding.

History 

The historic inhabitants of the area were the indigenous Umatilla, Cayuse, Walla Walla, and Columbia Indians, descendants of peoples who lived in this area for thousands of years. The earliest European settlers established a mission near Pendleton in 1847. The territorial government organized Umatilla County in 1862 from the larger Wasco County. On July 10, 1907, the town of Hermiston was incorporated. The original railroad station was named Maxwell, likely after a contemporary official at the railroad company. Colonel J. F. McNaught, an early settler in the region, later named it Hermiston from Robert Louis Stevenson's unfinished novel Weir of Hermiston.

The greater Hermiston region began to see irrigated agriculture in 1908, with the completion of the U.S. Bureau of Reclamation's Umatilla Basin Project in the form of Cold Springs Reservoir.  The region saw modest growth until the outbreak of World War II, when the Umatilla Army Depot was constructed, causing Hermiston's population to jump from 803 at the 1940 US Census to 3,804 in 1950.  The region continued to experience modest growth for the next several decades until the 1970's, when low power costs coupled with the development of center-pivot irrigation resulted in a significant expansion in agricultural acreage put in to potato production.  The expansion of potato production coincided with the development of large potato processing plants by Lamb-Weston and Simplot, focusing on frozen potato products.  The associated economic development drove Hermiston's population to nearly double from 4,893 in 1970 to 9,408 by 1980.  The 1990's brought additional large employment developments to the Hermiston region in the form of Two Rivers Correctional Institution, a Wal-Mart Distribution Center, expansion of the Union Pacific Hinkle Rail Yard, and beginning of the Umatilla Army Depot's Chemical Weapon Incineration process.  The 2000's have seen continued growth and diversification of the regional economy as Hermiston has grown to a population of 19,354 at the 2020 Census and has become a regional center for commercial and professional services.

Economy

Retail 

Hermiston serves as the retail and services center for much of western Umatilla County, as well as Morrow County and parts of Gilliam county.  Hermiston's Local Trade Area, which describes the area where people will travel to purchase items on a weekly basis, stretches from Pendleton on the East, the Columbia River to the North, Heppner to the South, and Gilliam County to the West.  There were 46,000 people living within Hermiston's Local Trade Area based on 2010 U.S. Census data.  Major national chain retailers in Hermiston include Wal-Mart, Home Depot, Big Lots, Sears, AutoZone, Big 5 Sporting Goods  and Harbor Freight, among many others.  The community also has Ford, Chevy, Dodge, Toyota, and Subaru dealerships.  Despite a relatively robust local retail & services market, Hermiston experiences significant retail sales leakage to the Tri-Cities for items purchased on less than a weekly basis.  The Tri-Cities, located approximately 30 minutes north of Hermiston in Washington, had a metro-area population of 275,740 as of April 1, 2014, making it the fourth largest metropolitan area in Washington.

Workforce 
Hermiston has the largest 30-mile-radius workforce in Eastern Oregon.  According to 2018 U.S. Census estimates, there were 135,503 people actively employed within a 30-mile radius of Hermiston;  in comparison, there are 75,075 in the next-largest regional Labor Shed in Bend.  Hermiston-area employers benefit greatly from the proximity of the Tri-Cities in Washington which, based on light traffic, and easy freeway access, is approximately 30–35 minutes to the north of Hermiston.  This proximity also allows dual-income households good access to employment opportunities for both wage earners.

Top employers

According to the City of Hermiston's 2020 Comprehensive Annual Financial Report, the top employers in the area are:

Parks 

The City of Hermiston Parks Department maintains 10 parks, 13 landscape areas, and 100-plus acres for the enjoyment of the community. In addition to the developed parks, the Department also has 50 additional acres planned for future development.  Recent major enhancements include the additions of Riverfront Park, the Oxbow Trail, and continual additions to the Hermiston Family Aquatic Center.  Riverfront Park features 16 acres of open grassy areas alongside the Umatilla River, as well as nearly a mile of paved walking paths, with picnic shelters, restrooms, and fishing access. A 1.8-mile paved walking path, named the Oxbow Trail, was added in 2015 to connect Riverfront Park with the north side of town near Good Shepherd Medical Center.  The Trail winds through protected wetland area for nearly the entirety of its length and also connects to Harrison Park.

Geography

Distance to major cities:
 Tri-Cities, Washington - 
 Portland, Oregon - 
 Seattle, Washington - 
 Spokane, Washington - 
 Boise, Idaho - 
 Salt Lake City, Utah - 
 Missoula, Montana - 

Hermiston's recent population growth is due to its proximity to large cities in the Pacific Northwest and its location along two major freeways.

Climate
According to the Köppen climate classification system, Hermiston has a steppe climate (Köppen BSk). This gives the area hot dry summers with high daytime temperatures which do cool considerably overnight, and relatively cold winters which typically yield several snow storms per year with relatively minimal accumulation.

Demographics

2020 Census 
As of the U.S. Census of 2020, there were 19,354 people residing in the city, a growth of 2,609 residents since the 2010 Census.  Due to its consistent growth registering as an outlier among rural communities across the U.S., the 2020 Census figure far out-paced the Census Bureau's 2019 estimate for the community of 17,782.  This same phenomenon occurred with the community's 2010 Census count far exceeded government estimates from 2009.

The racial makeup of the city was 56% White, 0.6% African American, 1.5% Native American, 1.4% Asian, 0.3% Pacific Islander, 22.6% from other races, and 17% identified as more than one race.  Hispanic or Latino of any race were 44.2% of the population.

2010 census
As of the census of 2010, there were 16,745 people, 6,050 households, and 4,184 families residing in the city. The racial makeup of the city was 74.2% White, 0.8% African American, 1.3% Native American, 1.5% Asian, 0.2% Pacific Islander, 19.0% from other races, and 3.0% from two or more races. Hispanic or Latino of any race were 34.9% of the population.

There were 6,050 households, of which 42.0% had children under the age of 18 living with them, 47.9% were married couples living together, 14.5% had a female householder with no husband present, 6.8% had a male householder with no wife present, and 30.8% were non-families. 25.8% of all households were made up of individuals, and 9.9% had someone living alone who was 65 years of age or older. The average household size was 2.74 and the average family size was 3.28.

The median age in the city was 30.9 years. 31.7% of residents were under the age of 18; 9.2% were between the ages of 18 and 24; 27.3% were from 25 to 44; 20.8% were from 45 to 64; and 11% were 65 years of age or older. The gender makeup of the city was 49.4% male and 50.6% female.

Education

K-12 
Hermiston School District is the largest district in Eastern Oregon, with 5,508 students in the 2020-21 school year.  The district has one high school, Hermiston High School, which hosts 1,703 students.  Due to the school's size, it is able to offer comprehensive programming and courses for all students.  The district also is composed of two middle schools and six elementary schools.  There are also two private schools in Hermiston.

Voters in the Hermiston School District have shown strong support for education as the district has experienced sustained robust enrollment growth. Voters approved a $69.9 million capital construction bond in November, 2008, and another $82.7 million capital construction bond in November, 2019. The 2019 bond added a new elementary school near the intersection of NE 10th and Theater Lane, and replaced the 57-year old Rocky Heights Elementary School on-site with a larger facility. The 2019 bond will also add capacity for an additional 200 students at Hermiston High School.

High School Sports 
Hermiston High School competes at the 3A level in the Washington Interscholastic Activities Association.  This cross-state membership was approved by the WIAA in 2017 in recognition of the lack of comparable sized large high schools elsewhere in Eastern Oregon.  The second largest High School in Eastern Oregon was Pendleton, with only 815 students, compared to Hermiston's 1,703.  The WIAA membership allows HHS to compete in the Mid-Columbia Conference against high schools from Kennewick, Richland, Pasco, and Walla Walla, Washington and significantly reduce travel times for conference games.

Higher education 
Blue Mountain Community College has a branch in Hermiston.  Eastern Oregon University also hosts undergraduate and graduate-level courses at the Eastern Oregon Higher Education Center in Hermiston.

Transportation

Highways and roads 
Hermiston benefits from being near the exact center of the Pacific Northwest, and at the crossroads of several major interstate highways.  Drivers can easily access all four major Northwest metropolitan areas in just a half-day's drive.  Portland is less than 3 hours to the West, and drivers can also reach Spokane in less than 3 hours to the northeast, while Seattle and Boise are both approximately 4 hours away to the northwest and southeast, respectively.  Highways serving Hermiston include Interstate 84 and U.S. Route 30, both of which run east–west, U.S. Route 395, which runs north–south, and Interstate 82, which has its southern terminus near Hermiston and continues north to Ellensburg, Washington.

Major transportation-related businesses in Hermiston include Wal-Mart's Northwest Distribution Center, and both FedEx and United Parcel Service (UPS) have freight distribution facilities in Hermiston.

Rail 
Hermiston is on the La Grande Subdivision of the Union Pacific Railroad, constructed originally through the area in the 1870s as the Oregon Railroad and Navigation Company. Railroad facilities include the Hinkle Locomotive Service and Repair Facility and "hump yard" located just outside the city.

Airports 
Hermiston Municipal Airport is a city-owned airport serving General Aviation pilots, corporate jet traffic, agricultural operations, and cargo operations.  There are currently no commercial flights out of Hermiston.

Tri-Cities Airport is located approximately 40 minutes north of Hermiston, and offers commercial flights to Seattle, Salt Lake City, Denver, Minneapolis, Las Vegas, Portland, San Francisco, and Phoenix.  In 2014, due to strong growth in demand, the Port of Pasco approved a $42 million renovation and expansion, that will double the size of the current terminal.

Media

Radio
KOHU 1360 AM (Country)
KQFM 93.7 FM (AC)
KLKY 96.1 FM (Classic Rock) - Licensed to Stanfield, Oregon
KZLY 99.5 FM (Spanish)
KGTS 91.3 FM (Christian)
KOLH 105.9 FM (Catholic - EWTN Radio)

Newspapers
The Hermiston Herald (published Wednesday)
East Oregonian (Pendleton paper with coverage of Hermiston, published Tuesday through Saturday)

Notable people
 Tucker Bounds, public relations professional
 Bucky Jacobsen, baseball player
 Chuck Norris, politician
 Shoni Schimmel, basketball player
 Jim Stuart, football player
 Jared Zabransky, football player

Annual events
 Hermiston Raceway/Super Oval,  paved oval stock car track, races almost every Saturday from late April through the end of September every year.
 Farm City Pro Rodeo, annual rodeo held in August
 Umatilla County Fair

See also
 Hermiston Butte
 Hat Rock State Park
 Oregon Route 207

Footnotes

Further reading

 Ronald E. Ingle, Oasis in the Desert: The Story of Hermiston from Sagebrush to City. Caldwell, ID: Caxton Printers, 2002.

External links

 Entry for Hermiston in the Oregon Blue Book
 City of Hermiston official website

 
Cities in Oregon
Cities in Umatilla County, Oregon
Pendleton–Hermiston Micropolitan Statistical Area
1907 establishments in Oregon
Populated places established in 1907